Nguyễn Thị Bình (born Nguyễn Châu Sa; 26 May 1927) is a Vietnamese revolutionary leader, diplomat and politician who became internationally known for her role as head of the Viet Cong (NLF) delegation at the Paris Peace Conference. The only woman to sign the 1973 peace accords that ended American intervention in the Vietnam War, she served in the government of reunified Vietnam after the Fall of Saigon and later became the country's Vice President in 1992. She is the first woman in Vietnamese history to be appointed a cabinet minister.

Life and work
Nguyễn Thị Bình was born in 1927 in Châu Thành, Sa Đéc Province and is a granddaughter of the Nationalist leader Phan Chu Trinh. She studied French at Lycée Sisowath in Cambodia and worked as a teacher during the French colonisation of Vietnam. She joined Vietnam's Communist Party in 1948. From 1945 to 1951, she took part in various intellectual movements against the French colonists. Subsequently, she was arrested and jailed between 1951 and 1953 in Chí Hòa Prison (Saigon) by the French colonial authority in Vietnam.

During the Vietnam War, she became a member of the Vietcong's Central Committee and a vice-chairperson of the South Vietnamese Women's Liberation Association. In 1969 she was appointed foreign minister of the Provisional Revolutionary Government of the Republic of South Vietnam. A fluent French speaker, Bình played a major role in the Paris Peace Accords on Vietnam, an agreement that was supposed to end the war and restore peace in Vietnam, which was signed in Paris and which entered into force 17 January 1973. She was expected to be replaced by a male Vietcong representative after preliminary talks, but quickly became one of the group's most visible international public figures. During that time, she was very famous in representing Vietnamese women with her elegant and gracious style, and was named by the media as "Madame Bình". She was the only woman who signed the Paris Peace Accords.

After the Vietnam War, she was appointed Minister of Education of the Socialist Republic of Vietnam and from 1982 to 1986, which made her the first female minister ever in the history of Viet Nam. Nguyen Thi Binh was a member of the Central Committee of Vietnam's Communist Party, since 1987 to 1992, was Vice Head of the Central External Relations Department of Party. The National Assembly elected her twice to the position of Vice President of the Socialist Republic of Vietnam for the terms 1992–1997 and 1997–2002.

References 

1927 births
Living people
People from Đồng Tháp Province
Members of the 5th Central Committee of the Communist Party of Vietnam
Vice presidents of Vietnam
Government ministers of Vietnam
Women government ministers of Vietnam
Vietnamese prisoners and detainees
Prisoners and detainees of France
Female foreign ministers
Vietnamese nationalists
Vietnamese revolutionaries
20th-century Vietnamese women politicians
20th-century Vietnamese politicians
Vietnamese women diplomats
Women vice presidents
21st-century Vietnamese women politicians
21st-century Vietnamese politicians